The swimming competition at the 1963 Mediterranean Games was held in Naples, Italy.

Medallists

Men's events

Medal table

References
Complete 1963 Mediterranean Games report released by the International Mediterranean Games Committee

Mediterranean Games
Sports at the 1963 Mediterranean Games
1963